Jed Seidel is an American  television producer and screenwriter.

Credits
Seidel's major credits include episodes of Northern Exposure, Deadly Games, Felicity (TV series), More, Patience, Black Sash, The Haunting of Sorority Row, Terriers, Hollywood Heights, Nash Bridges, Miss Match, Veronica Mars, Ghost Whisperer, Greek, El don de Alba, and Gilmore Girls.

Awards and nominations
WGA Award

References

External links

Living people
American television writers
American male television writers
Year of birth missing (living people)